Ryan Weiss (born December 10, 1996) is an American professional baseball pitcher in the Kansas City Royals organization.

Amateur career 
Weiss attended South Elgin High School in South Elgin, Illinois. In 2015, his senior year, he went 6–3 with a 2.12 ERA over  innings. As a high schooler, his fastball reached only . He originally signed to play college baseball at Elgin Community College, but switched his commitment to Wright State University in June 2015.

Weiss redshirted his freshman year at Wright State in 2016. In 2017, as a redshirt freshman, he appeared in 15 games (14 starts) in which he compiled a 2.13 ERA with eighty strikeouts over  innings and was named the Horizon League Freshman of the Year alongside earning All-American honors. That summer, he played collegiate summer baseball with the Hyannis Harbor Hawks of the Cape Cod Baseball League and was named a league all-star. In 2018, he pitched to a 3.40 ERA over 98 innings. After the season's end, he was selected by the Arizona Diamondbacks in the fourth round of the 2018 Major League Baseball draft.

Professional career

Arizona Diamondbacks
After signing, Weiss made his professional debut with the Rookie-level Arizona League Diamondbacks before being promoted to the Hillsboro Hops of the Class A Short Season Northwest League. Over  innings, he compiled a 3.86 ERA. Weiss began the 2019 season with the Class A Midwest League Kane County Cougars and was later promoted to the Visalia Rawhide of the Class A-Advanced California League, pitching  innings to an 8–7 record and a 4.07 ERA over 26 starts between both teams. In 2021, Weiss began the year with the Amarillo Sod Poodles of the Double-A Central and was promoted to the Reno Aces of the Triple-A West in July. Over 34 appearances (eight starts) between the two clubs, Weiss went 6–3 with a 4.60 ERA and 88 strikeouts over  innings.

On November 19, 2021, the Diamondbacks selected Weiss' contract and added him to their 40-man roster. He opened the 2022 season with Amarillo and was promoted to Reno in late May. On June 26, he was designated for assignment.

Kansas City Royals
On July 1, 2022, Weiss was claimed off waivers by the Kansas City Royals and optioned to the Triple-A Omaha Storm Chasers. He was sent outright to Triple-A on October 26, 2022.

Personal life
Weiss' parents divorced when he was a child and his father committed suicide when Weiss was 14 years old. In January 2018, his mother died of a heart attack.

References

External links 

Minor league baseball players
1996 births
Living people
Baseball pitchers
Baseball players from Illinois
Sportspeople from Kane County, Illinois
Hyannis Harbor Hawks players
Wright State Raiders baseball players
Arizona League Diamondbacks players
Hillsboro Hops players
Kane County Cougars players
Visalia Rawhide players
Amarillo Sod Poodles players
Reno Aces players
Omaha Storm Chasers players